Caballo Dam is an earthen dam on the Rio Grande about  downstream from Truth or Consequences, New Mexico, United States. Caballo serves as an afterbay for the Elephant Butte Reservoir, i.e. it stores water released from Elephant Butte for hydroelectricity generation purposes and discharges it in the dry season to provide for irrigation agriculture downstream. The dam is an important part of the Rio Grande Project. A secondary purpose of the dam was to compensate for lost capacity in Elephant Butte Lake due to sedimentation.

See also
Caballo Lake State Park
List of rivers of New Mexico

References

External links
Rio Grande Project History

Dams in New Mexico
Buildings and structures in Sierra County, New Mexico
United States Bureau of Reclamation dams
Dams completed in 1938
Dams on the Rio Grande
1938 establishments in New Mexico